Sheffield University Rowing Club (SURC) is the rowing club for The University of Sheffield and is based on Damflask Reservoir near Lower Bradfield, Sheffield, England.

History
The club was founded in 1964 by a small group of students from Sheffield University. Based at Damflask Reservoir, within the Peak District, the boathouse used by the club is shared with Sheffield Hallam University RC. The club relies on donations from alumni, competitions and annual membership to care for the upkeep of their boats and equipment.

Sheffield Varsity
The Sheffield Varsity has run since 1997. During that time, Sheffield University RC has never lost the Varsity competition against their Sheffield rivals Sheffield Hallam University RC.

See also
University rowing (UK)

External links
http://www.sheffielduniversityrowingclub.co.uk/
http://www.shef.ac.uk/

1964 establishments in England
Sports clubs established in 1964
Clubs and societies of the University of Sheffield
Boathouses in the United Kingdom
University and college rowing clubs in the United Kingdom